The 1939–40 English National League season was the fifth season of the English National League, the top level ice hockey league in England. Five teams participated in the league, and the Harringay Greyhounds won the championship.

Regular season

External links
 Season on hockeydb.com

Eng
Engl
Engl
English National League seasons
1939–40 in British ice hockey